Zoe Tynan (20 May 1998 – 30 August 2016) was an English footballer who played as a midfielder for Manchester City and Fylde Ladies.

Club career
Having signed for Manchester City's academy in 2015, Tynan was given her first team debut when she played all 90 minutes of a FA Women's Cup quarter-final against Sporting Club Albion on 3 April 2016.

Though she did not play any further matches for Manchester City, her performance drew the attention of FA Women's Premier League side Fylde Ladies for whom she signed in the summer of 2016. Tynan would go on to play twice for Fylde.

Death
On 31 August 2016, it was reported that Tynan had died at the age of 18. It was subsequently announced that Zoe's death was an act of suicide, caused by a fatal collision with a train at West Allerton railway station.

Her death was met by an outpouring of tributes from across the women's footballing community in England. In particular, her first team – Liverpool Feds, whom she had joined as a six-year old – announced the creation of the Zoe Tynan Tournament for under-10 and under-12 7-a-side teams which would be played on 20 May, coinciding with the date of her birth. The competition has become an annual event which has been held every year since 2017.

Career statistics

Club

References

1998 births
2016 suicides
English women's footballers
Women's association football midfielders
Manchester City W.F.C. players
Fylde Ladies F.C. players
Footballers from Liverpool
Liverpool Feds W.F.C. players
Suicides by train
Suicides in England
2016 deaths